The 2019 Houston mayoral election was decided by a runoff that took place on December 14, 2019 to elect the Mayor of Houston. Incumbent mayor Sylvester Turner defeated attorney Tony Buzbee in the runoff by 56.04% to 43.96%. No candidate won a majority of the vote during the general election on November 5, 2019 where Turner received 46% of the vote and Buzbee received 29%.

Declared candidates 

The following candidates have announced their candidacies for the 2019 Houston mayoral election:

Candidates

Incumbent

 Sylvester Turner, Mayor of Houston, elected to his first term in the 2015 mayoral election

Challengers
In September 2019, it was announced that 11 other names will appear on the ballot.

 Derrick Broze, author and activist
 Tony Buzbee, attorney
 Bill King - businessman and 2015 mayoral candidate
 Booker T, professional wrestler, promoter, and color commentator. By September 2019, his legal name of Booker Huffman was not among those who applied for the ballot.
 Dwight Boykins, current Houston City Councilman, District D
 Sue Lovell, former Houston City Councilwoman, at-large seat 2

Election results 
Held November 5, 2019 -- 50% needed to avoid runoff

Held December 14, 2019

Notes

References

2019 in Houston
Houston
Houston
2019
Non-partisan elections